is a Japanese athlete. She competed in the women's marathon event at the 2019 World Athletics Championships.

References

External links

1991 births
Living people
Japanese female long-distance runners
Japanese female marathon runners
Place of birth missing (living people)
World Athletics Championships athletes for Japan